Cho Sang-Hyun (born 8 July 1976) is a South Korean professional basketball coach and retired player formerly with the Korean KBL team Changwon LG Sakers. He represented South Korea's national basketball team on many occasions.

He played the Shooting guard / Small forward positions.

Achievements

Individual
1998-99, 2001: Korea national basketball team
2001, 2004, 2005, 2009: Korean KBL All Star Game
2001: Korean KBL All Star Game Champion 3 point contest
2001: Korean KBL Model player

Team
2001: Bronze at Asian Championship
1999: Silver at Asian Championship

References

1976 births
Living people
Asian Games medalists in basketball
Basketball players at the 1998 Asian Games
Basketball players at the 2002 Asian Games
Suwon KT Sonicboom players
Changwon LG Sakers players
Goyang Carrot Jumpers players
Korean Basketball League players
Seoul SK Knights players
Shooting guards
Small forwards
South Korean men's basketball players
Basketball players from Seoul
Identical twins
Twin sportspeople
South Korean twins
Asian Games gold medalists for South Korea
Asian Games silver medalists for South Korea
Medalists at the 1998 Asian Games
Medalists at the 2002 Asian Games
1998 FIBA World Championship players
South Korean basketball coaches